Whitemore may refer to:

 Whitemore, Staffordshire, a location in England
 Whitemore, Tasmania, Australia
 Hugh Whitemore (1936–2018), English playwright and screenwriter